The Kauai serial killer is an unidentified serial killer and rapist who murdered two women and injured another on the island of Kauai, Hawaii, between April and August of 2000. Despite a composite sketch of the perpetrator and the availability of his DNA, he was never caught, and the murders remain unsolved.

Murders

Lisa Bissell 
On April 7, 2000, the body of Lisa Bissell, a 38-year-old woman from Hanapepe, was found in a ditch close to Polihale state park. She was raped, beaten, and later stabbed to death. Her throat was also slashed. Some of her belongings were found off of a road in Waimea, so it's believed she was abducted from there.

Attempted murder 
On May 22, 2000, a 52-year-old woman was severely wounded by the perpetrator in Kekaha. The perpetrator approached the victim in the yard she was working in and told her, "My name is John and I'm homeless." The victim recommended that he visit her neighbors home, where the owners frequently let homeless people camp on their property. When she turned around to continue working, the assailant forcefully took her behind the house and beat her, breaking one of her arms. He then sexually assaulted the victim. He later stabbed her in the chest with a knife, but the knife bent after it hit the victim's breastbone, so he threw it in a bush and fled. The victim crawled for three hours until she reached a telephone and called for help.

Daren Singer 
On August 30, 2000, the decomposing body of Daren R. Singer, a 43-year-old woman from Maui, was found at a remote campsite near Pakala Point Beach. She was raped, stabbed in the throat, and beaten to death. Her face was almost beaten beyond the point of recognition. Investigators determined that she was murdered at least 12 hours prior to the discovery of her body. A memorial service held for Singer in September of the same year was attended by more than 500 people.

Investigation 
The surviving victim described her attacker, and a composite sketch of the perpetrator was created. A few months after the attack, she was flown to Honolulu and shown a police lineup. The woman was able to eliminate two men from the lineup as being the perpetrator, but was not able to narrow down the lineup any further. The police also questioned the seventy registered sex offenders on the island.

Similarities between murders 
 All victims were middle-aged Caucasian women with similar heights and weights.
 All of the victims were sexually assaulted.
 All of the victims were alone when they were attacked.
 A knife was used in every attack.
 All of the attacks happened on the west coast of Kauai.

Suspect 
The prime suspect in the case is Waldorf Roy Wilson, a Hawaiian sex offender. He was convicted of a rape and kidnapping on Oahu in 1983. Wilson was paroled on January 9, 1999, and moved to Kauai. On September 12, 2000, Wilson was arrested again for violating his parole. After he was arrested, KHNL Channel 8 News broadcast that Wilson had been arrested for parole violations after being questioned about the murders. This led to Wilson suing the Kauai County Police Department and Honolulu Magazine for defamation, but this lawsuit was later dismissed in 2009.

Waldorf Wilson's DNA was tested against the DNA of the perpetrator, and the result was inconclusive. He was never charged with the murders.

In media 
The case was featured on season 21, episode 7 of America's Most Wanted. The episode, titled, "Trouble in Paradise," was first aired on November 10, 2007.

References

External links 
 Cold Case - Lisa Bissell Kauai County
 Cold Case - Daren Singer Kauai County

2000 in Hawaii
2000 murders in the United States
21st-century American criminals
American male criminals
American rapists
American serial killers
Deaths by stabbing in the United States
Male serial killers
Murder in Hawaii
Unidentified American serial killers
Unidentified American rapists
Unsolved murders in the United States
Violence against women in the United States